The Fédération nationale des Jaunes de France (English: National Federation of the Yellows of France) was a French 'yellow' or company union founded by Pierre Biétry on 1 April 1902 and active until 1912.

According to historian George L. Mosse, the union "received this name when workers who refused to strike used yellow paper to stop up the windows of their meeting place, which had been smashed by strikers" in 1901 at Montceau-les-Mines.

See also 

 Yellow socialism

References

Bibliography

Trade unions in France

Trade unions established in 1902
1902 establishments in France
Company unions